Walden Head is a hamlet in the Yorkshire Dales, North Yorkshire. The village lies in the civil parish of Burton-cum-Walden.

The road from West Burton peters out just south of the hamlet, but an old packhorse track goes over Buckden Pike and ends in the village of Starbotton.

Walden Head, like the other small settlements in the Walden Valley, have changed little over modern times. The Walden Valley is sometimes referred to as Waldendale, but this is not common. The name Walden means 'Valley of the Welsh'.

References

External links

Villages in North Yorkshire